"Just Another Illusion" is the second single from Hurricane #1's self-titled debut album. The song reached number 35 on the UK singles chart.

Track listing 
CD CRESCD 264
 "Just Another Illusion" - 5:40
 "Touchdown" - 4:40
 "Slapshot" - 4:59

7" CRE 264
 "Just Another Illusion" - 5:40
 "Touchdown" - 4:40

Track listing (Limited Edition) 
CD CRESCD 264X
 "Just Another Illusion" - 5:40
 "Just Another Illusion (Midfield General #10 mix)" - 5:51
 "Just Another Illusion (FC Kahuna mix)" - 6:43

Personnel 
"Just Another Illusion"
Produced by Stephen Harris and Andy Bell.
Engineered and mixed by Stephen Harris.
"Touchdown" 
Produced by Andy Bell and engineered by Gideon Karmiloff.
"Slapshot"
Produced by Andy Bell and engineered by Gideon Karmiloff.

"Just Another Illusion Mixes"
1, Produced by Stephen Harris and Andy Bell
Engineered and mixed by Stephen Harris
3, Remix produced by Jon Nowell and Daniel Ormondroyd
All songs written by Andy Bell (Creation Songs)
Photography by Tim Page
Design by Phantom Industries

References

1997 singles
Songs written by Andy Bell (musician)
Song recordings produced by Andy Bell (musician)
1997 songs
Creation Records singles